The IPSC Spanish Handgun Championship is an IPSC level 3 championship held once a year by the Royal Spanish Olympic Shooting Federation.

Champions 
The following is a list of current and previous champions.

Overall category

Lady

Junior

Senior

Super Senior

References 

Match Results - 2005 IPSC Spanish Handgun Championship
Match Results - 2006 IPSC Spanish Handgun Championship, Standard & Production
Match Results - 2006 IPSC Spanish Handgun Championship, Open & Modified
Match Results - 2008 IPSC Spanish Handgun Championship
Match Results - 2009 IPSC Spanish Handgun Championship
Match Results - 2010 IPSC Spanish Handgun Championship
Match Results - 2011 IPSC Spanish Handgun Championship
Match Results - 2012 IPSC Spanish Handgun Championship
Match Results - 2013 IPSC Spanish Handgun Championship
Match Results - 2014 IPSC Spanish Handgun Championship
Match Results - 2015 IPSC Spanish Handgun Championship

IPSC shooting competitions
National shooting championships
Spain sport-related lists
Shooting competitions in Spain
Shooting